Charles Albert Whitcombe (21 September 1895 – 13 February 1978) was an English golfer. He was born in Berrow, Burnham-on-Sea, Somerset, the second of the three Whitcombe brothers who were all successful English professional golfers in the 1920s and 1930s and – despite never winning The Open Championship like his younger brother Reg – could be considered the most prominent of the three, winning the British PGA Matchplay Championship twice and captaining the Ryder Cup side four times.

Whitcombe finished fifth in The Open Championship in 1922, three shots behind the winner and beaten only by Walter Hagen, Jim Barnes, George Duncan and Jock Hutchison – the players who between them had won 8 of the previous 9 major championships. Whitcombe would enjoy several other high finishes in the Championship, beaten by players including Bobby Jones, Gene Sarazen and Henry Cotton, but only once again came as close to winning, in 1935, when he finished third, three shots behind Alf Perry at Muirfield.

Whitcombe won the British PGA Matchplay Championship in 1928 and 1930, and also won the Irish Open in 1930. Both of his Matchplay championship victories came in finals against a young Henry Cotton, by 12 years Whitcombe's junior. In 1931, 1935, and 1937 Whitcombe was selected as playing captain of the Great Britain and Ireland Ryder Cup side, having also played in every side from 1927 to 1933, and was then non-playing captain in 1949.

In 1937 Whitcombe was the first winner of the Harry Vardon Trophy, which was presented to the player with the best average in the major stroke play events.

Tournament wins
1921 West of England Professional Championship
1924 Daily Mail Tournament, West of England Professional Championship
1926 Yorkshire Evening News Tournament
1927 Daily Dispatch Northern Professional Championship, Glasgow Herald Tournament, Porters Park Invitational Tournament
1928 News of the World Match Play, Yorkshire Evening News Tournament
1929 West of England Professional Championship
1930 News of the World Match Play, Irish Open
1933 Addington Foursomes (with Cameron Anderson)
1935 Dunlop-Southport Tournament
1937 Southend Tournament
1938 Silver King Tournament
1939 Penfold Professional Golf League (tie with Henry Cotton)

Results in major championships

Note: Whitcombe never played in the Masters Tournament nor the PGA Championship.

NT = No tournament
WD = withdrew
DQ = disqualified
CUT = missed the half-way cut
"T" indicates a tie for a place

Team appearances
Ryder Cup (representing Great Britain): 1927, 1929 (winners), 1931 (captain), 1933 (winners), 1935 (captain), 1937 (captain),  1949 (non-playing captain)
France–Great Britain Professional Match (representing Great Britain): 1929 (winners)
England–Scotland Professional Match (representing England): 1932 (winners), 1933 (winners), 1934 (winners), 1935 (winners), 1936 (winners), 1937 (winners), 1938 (winners)
England–Ireland Professional Match (representing England): 1933 (winners)
Coronation Match (representing the Ladies and Professionals): 1937

References
Alliss, Peter: "The Who's Who of Golf" (1983), Orbis Publishing Ltd.

Further reading

English male golfers
Ryder Cup competitors for Europe
People from Burnham-on-Sea
1895 births
1978 deaths